Imaruí is a municipality in the state of Santa Catarina in the South region of Brazil.

The municipality contains part of the  Serra do Tabuleiro State Park, a protected area created in 1975.
The lushly-forested park protects the sources of the Vargem do Braço, Cubatão and D'Una rivers, which supply most of the drinking water for greater Florianópolis and the south coast region.

See also
List of municipalities in Santa Catarina

References

Municipalities in Santa Catarina (state)